Coleby Jason Lombardo (also credited as Coleby Lomardo, born September 7, 1978), is former child actor who appeared in nearly twenty productions. In 1988 he was nominated for Young Artist Award as Best Young Actor - Guest Starring in a Television Drama The Colbys.

Filmography
 1986 Sledge Hammer! (TV Series) as Kid In Bank
 1986-1987 The Colbys (TV Series) as Scott Cassidy
 1987 The Twilight Zone (TV Series) as Evan Wolfe (segment "The Card")
 1988 Highway to Heaven (TV Series) as John Barnett
 1988 Heartbeat (TV Series) as Zach
 1988 L.A. Law (TV Series) as Alexander Brackman
 1988 The Price of Life (Short) as Young Ned
 1988 Hooperman (TV Series)
 1989 thirtysomething (TV Series) as Nicholas
 1990 Poochinski (TV Short) as Kid With Knife
 1990 The Rookie as Joey Ackerman
 1990-1991 China Beach (TV Series) as Lanier Jr.
 1991 Career Opportunities (voice)
 1991 American Playhouse (TV Series) as Young Ned
 1991 Beverly Hills, 90210 (TV Series) as Felix
 1992 Radio Flyer as Fisher Friend #1
 1992 The Price She Paid (TV Movie) as R.T. (final film role)

References

Sources

1978 births
Living people
American male child actors
American male film actors
American male television actors
Male actors from Los Angeles
20th-century American male actors